Eat the Rich is a 1987 British black comedy film directed by Peter Richardson, who also wrote the screenplay with Pete Richens. A co-production between Channel 4 Films, Iron Fist Motion Pictures and Michael White Productions, it features cast members from the popular television series The Comic Strip Presents....

The film stars Lanah Pellay as Alex, Nosher Powell as the Home Secretary, and a number of cameos, including by Miranda Richardson, Nigel Planer, Robbie Coltrane, Rik Mayall, Paul McCartney, Shane MacGowan, Jennifer Saunders, Jimmy Fagg, Kathy Burke, Koo Stark, Sandie Shaw, Dawn French, Bill Wyman, Jools Holland, Hugh Cornwell, Adrian Edmondson, Angela Bowie and Lemmy.

Plot
Alex is a waiter in high-class London restaurant Bastards, subject to the upper-class customers' daily contempt. He is fired for being rude to the clientele. After witnessing a terrorist act on an embassy, he robs a benefits office and goes on the run with his new friend.

The Home Secretary is a menacing, beer-swilling, fornicating lout with his own way of dealing with trouble, usually with his fists. He is the darling of the voters, the press, and Fiona, a glamorous KGB agent. It was he who ended the terrorist situation earlier. His enemies include the sinister Commander Fortune, who plots a people's revolution with a difference, and General Karprov and Spider, who plot to derail the Home Secretary's campaign to become Prime Minister.

Alex returns to Bastards with a four-person team of anarchists and lays waste to the clientele and staff. He serves them up for consumption by other rich people in their new restaurant, and changed from Bastards to Eat the Rich. When Commander Fortune and Spider realise what's on the menu they formulate a plot to get rid of the conservative Home Secretary for good.

Cast

Reception
The film performed poorly at the box office, taking $200,723 across 4 screens in the USA. 
Channel 4 were disappointed with the returns on the film and shelved another Richardson project, Five Go To Hell.

Critics were mixed in their opinions on the film.
Hal Hinson writing in The Washington Post gave it a lukewarm review, writing "The punk jaggedness they bring to their derivations is the only hint of originality, but this, too, seems a little staid. It feels like punk on the downward swing, after most of its rude energy has dissipated." However Vincent Canby in The New York Times was more favourable and drew comparisons to "an upscale John Waters satire" and "Jean-Luc Godard's pre-Maoist period."

In January 1988 the film was one of those attacked for its critique of Thatcherite society by University of Oxford historian Norman Stone, which he condemned in The Sunday Times as being "worthless and insulting" and "riddled with left wing bias".

Eat The Rich featured at #49 in Time Out Londons list of "Cinema's 50 greatest flops, follies and failures."
 The feature stated: "[The film] may not have had the budget to be considered a true flop, but the back-alley production values and total lack of comic invention on display in this Thatcher-baiting misstep meant that any hopes of a Pythonesque run at the movies were knocked way back on their heels."

Soundtrack
The soundtrack album was released on the Filmtrax label, and featured six tracks by Motörhead, including the track "Eat the Rich", written especially for the film. The track also appeared on the Motörhead album Rock 'n' Roll, and was released in the UK as a single in its own right. It also featured a solo track, "Bess", by Würzel (Motörhead's second guitarist at the time).

The remaining Motorhead tracks are from their album Orgasmatron.

The soundtrack album also featured several pieces of incidental music from the film, as well as the synthpop track "Pistol in My Pocket" by Alan Pillay (credited as Lannah).

Track listing 
 Motörhead – "Eat the Rich"
 Simon Brint – "Terrorists"
 Motörhead – "Built for Speed"
 Danny Eccleston – "Nosher in the Bar"
 Motörhead – "Nothing Up My Sleeve"
 Simon Brint – "Arriba Salsa"
 Motörhead – "Doctor Rock"
 Motörhead – "On the Road (Live)"
 Lannah – "Pistol in My Pocket"
 Simon Brint – "Car Approach"
 Motörhead – "Orgasmatron"
 Würzel – "Bess"
 Danny Eccleston – "End Titles Theme"

Release notes
The VHS release of the film had a reversible cover.

References

External links 
 
 
 

1987 films
1987 comedy films
1980s black comedy films
British black comedy films
The Comic Strip
Films about cannibalism
Film4 Productions films
Films set in London
1980s English-language films
Films directed by Peter Richardson (British director)
1980s British films